That Night (French: Cette nuit là...) is a 1958 French crime drama film directed by Maurice Cazeneuve and starring Mylène Demongeot, Maurice Ronet and Jean Servais. It is an adaptation of the 1957 novel Un silence de mort by Michel Lebrun.

It was shot at the Billancourt Studios in Paris. The film's sets were designed by the art director Jacques Chalvet.

Cast
 Mylène Demongeot as Sylvie Mallet
 Maurice Ronet as Jean Mallet
 Jean Servais as André Reverdy
 Françoise Prévost as La secrétaire
 Jean Lara as L'inspecteur Toussaint
 Hubert Noël as Gérald Martin 
 Florence Arnaud as La femme à la lampe 
 Gilbert Edard as François
 Yves Arcanel as Le dessinateur
 Marc Doelnitz as Le boute en train
 Henri Maïk as Le photographe 
 Jacques Dhéry as Le correcteur
 Françoise Brion as Jeanne d'Arc
 Claude Bolling as himself

References

Bibliography 
 Walker-Morrison, Deborah. Classic French Noir: Gender and the Cinema of Fatal Desire. Bloomsbury Publishing, 2018.

External links 
 

1958 films
1958 crime films
French crime films
1950s French-language films
Films based on French novels
1950s French films